Rhythm Inside may refer to:
"Rhythm Inside" (Loïc Nottet song) (2015)
"Rhythm Inside" (Calum Scott song) (2016)